Kalat-e Hay-ye Sharqi Rural District is a rural district (dehestan) in the Central District of Meyami County, Semnan Province, Iran. At the 2006 census, its population was 6,420, in 1,682 families.  The rural district has 20 villages. One of these villages is Reyabad.

References 

Rural Districts of Semnan Province
Meyami County